These are the District Council (Second) functional constituency results of the 2016 Legislative Council election. The election was held on 4 September 2016 and all 5 seats in were contested. The pan-democracy camp failed to achieve coordination and fielded six candidate lists while the pro-Beijing camp fielded only three seats, two for Democratic Alliance for the Betterment and Progress of Hong Kong (DAB) and one for the Hong Kong Federation of Trade Unions (FTU). FTU incumbent Chan Yuen-han was no longer eligible for running as she retired from the District Council and Association for Democracy and People's Livelihood (ADPL) and Democratic Party incumbents Frederick Fung and Albert Ho lost their eligibility for running as they lost their District Council seats.

The Democratic Party and the DAB both fielded their young candidates, Kwong Chun-yu and Holden Chow, to fight for the last seat, in which they were neck-to-neck in the opinion polls, while Democratic Party veteran James To, DAB chairwoman Starry Lee, Neighbourhood and Worker's Service Centre's (NWSC) veteran Leung Yiu-chung and FTU veteran Wong Kwok-hing led comfortably in the polls. 48 hours before the election day, three pro-democrat candidates Sumly Chan of Civic Party, Ho Kai-ming of ADPL and Kwan Wing-yip of Neo Democrats abandoned their campaign to boost the chance for Kwong to win the last seat. Pro-democrat scholar Benny Tai's "smart voters" plan also ask his participants to vote for Kwong. As a result, Kwong received the highest votes of 491,667 while James To won the last seat by defeating Wong Kwok-hing with a margin of 10,694 votes.

Overall results
Before election:

Change in composition:

Candidates list

Opinion polling

See also
Legislative Council of Hong Kong
Hong Kong legislative elections
2016 Hong Kong legislative election

References

2016 Hong Kong legislative election